Three anonymous artists have been called Master of the Death of the Virgin, after works depicting the Death of the Virgin Mary:

Master of the Death of the Virgin (engraver), a German engraver active in the middle of the fifteenth century
Master of the Death of the Virgin (painter), a Netherlandish painter of the sixteenth century
Master of the Amsterdam Death of the Virgin, another Netherlandish painter

See also
Master of the Life of the Virgin